Johann Eustach von Westernach (December 16, 1545 - October 25, 1627) was the 44th Grandmaster of the Teutonic Order, reigning from 1625 to 1627.

Biography 
At a young age, he was orphaned by his father. His mother desired to have him be a priest

He first joined the Teutonic Order in 1566. He largely spent the next few decades working menial occupations within the order. In 1567, one year after joining the order, he became the Küchenmeister (kitchen master), for the local Komturs at the city of Ellingen. In 1571, he became trappier (or the individual responsible for the clothing supply) for the chamber komturs in Frankfurt. In 1580, he became hauskomtur (house commander) in Ellingen. 

In 1585, he became the Landkomtur of the Bailiwick of Franconia. As the person in this position, he became the de facto coadjutor to the Austrian Archduke Maximilian III, who under the de jure Grandmaster Heinrich von Bobenhausen, had effectively seized control over the order, effectively deposing Heinrich. As coadjutor to Maximilian III, Johan Eustach accompanied Maximilian in his campaigns against the Polish-Lithuanian Commonwealth in the War of the Polish Succession. After Maximilian's defeat at Kraków and his surrender at Byczyna, he returned to Mergentheim. There, he aided Maximilian III in his efforts to halt Heinrich's attempt at ousting the Hapsburgs from power within the order. From 1593 to 1599, Johann accompanied Maximilian (who was now officially Grandmaster of the Teutonic Order) in Hapsburg Hungary and Croatia. Johann often served as envoy in secret missions from the imperial court.

In 1612, Johann was officially appointed as the coadjutor to Maximilian III. Despite this, when Maximilian passed in 1618, he declined to run for Grandmaster and instead favored Charles of Austria, Bishop of Wroclaw, to be Grandmaster. Upon Charles' election, Johann became his coadjutor.

Grandmaster of the Teutonic Order 
Charles died on December 24, 1624. Johann Eustach initially put forth Archduke Leopold Wilhelm of Austria to be Grandmaster, however, the young Archduke was less than 11 years old at the time. With this, Johann was forced to accept his election as Grandmaster of the Teutonic Knights on March 19, 1625, becoming the temporary ruler of the order, effectively serving as regent for Leopold Wilhelm. 

Johann's reign was largely marked by issues stemming from the ongoing Thirty Years War, not just as head of the Teutonic Order, but also as head of the Westernach family, based from Swabia. Johann wished to retake Prussia from the Hohenzollerns, who under former Grandmaster Albert, Duke of Prussia, had seized what was once the base of the Teutonic Order. The Holy Roman Emperor, Ferdinand II, pressured him into joining the pro-Imperial coalition in the Thirty Years War, having sent Johann a letter promising him Teutonic control of Prussia. He also considered rebasing the order in Croatia or Hungary (where they were based in the early 13th century).

Johann perished suddenly on October 25, 1687. He was buried at the Deutschordenskirche in Mergentheim.

References 

Grand Masters of the Teutonic Order
1545 births

1627 deaths